P113 may refer to:

 , a patrol boat of the Mexican Navy
 Papyrus 113, a biblical manuscript
 STAT2, signal transducer and activator of transcription 2
 , a patrol boat of the Turkish Navy
 P113, a state regional road in Latvia